Zgornje Duplice (in older sources also Gorenje Duplice) is a small settlement northeast of Grosuplje in central Slovenia. The area is part of the historical region of Lower Carniola. The Municipality of Grosuplje is included in the Central Slovenia Statistical Region.

References

External links

Zgornje Duplice on Geopedia

Populated places in the Municipality of Grosuplje